A number of steamships have been named Belgica.
 , a barque-rigged ship used in the Belgian Antarctic Expedition of 1897–1901.
 , built by The Strand Slipway Co, Sunderland. As Fertilia, she was torpedoed and sunk by HMS Thunderbolt on 30 January 1942
 , built by The Pusey & Jones Co, Wilmington, Delaware. Laid down as War Compass. Scrapped in 1960
 , survey vessel of the Belgian navy

Ship names